The 2001 Osaka Kintetsu Buffaloes season was the 51st season of the franchise in Nippon Professional Baseball, the team's 4th season at Osaka Dome, and the team's 51st season under Kintetsu Railway. This was also the team's second season under manager Masataka Nashida. For another year, the Buffaloes were led offensively by star tandem Norihiro Nakamura and Tuffy Rhodes. For the first time since 1989, the Buffaloes won the Pacific League pennant, and in stunning fashion, with Hirotoshi Kitagawa hitting a grand slam walk-off home run against the Orix BlueWave to secure the pennant. Had they lost, they still had to win a series against the Fukuoka Daiei Hawks to win the pennant. They however, would lose to the Yakult Swallows in the Japan Series in 5 games. This season would also be Kintetsu's last Pacific League pennant win.

Regular season 
The Buffaloes finished in first place, with a 78-58-6 record, with a .567 winning percentage.

References 

Osaka Kintetsu Buffaloes
2001 Nippon Professional Baseball season